Muza and Musa and Mousa was an important emporion on the Arabian coast of the Red Sea at the Arabia Felix near the Strait of Bab-el-Mandeb in modern Yemen.
Now it is inland from the modern port city of Mokha due to the recession of the coast.

The city was mentioned at the Periplus of the Erythraean Sea, Pliny the Elder's Natural History and the Ptolemy's Geography.

Pliny describe the Musa as the third port of Arabia Felix. The Periplus of the Erythraean Sea has detailed description of its trade.

References

Further reading
 The Coastal Arabia and the adjacent Sea-Basins in the Periplus of the Erythrean Sea (Trade, Geography and Navigation), Michael Bukharin, pp. 177-236
 Patterns of trade in the Red Sea during the Age of the Periplus Maris Erythraei

Ancient Greek geography of Arabia